Hortensio Vidaurreta (11 January 1928 – 28 February 1984) was a Spanish road racing cyclist. Professional from 1947 to 1960, he won the Vuelta a Andalucía in 1957.

Major results

1947
 2nd Subida a Arrate
1948
 1st GP Vizcaya
 2nd GP Alava
 2nd Subida a Arantzazu
 2nd Subida a Arrate
1949
 2nd GP Pascuas
1951
 1st Campeonato Vasco-Navarro de Montaña
1952
 1st Campeonato Vasco-Navarro de Montaña
 1st Subida a Arrate
 1st Stage 7 Vuelta in Castilla 
 3rd Prueba Villafranca de Ordizia
 3rd Overall Gran Premio de la Bicicleta Eibarresa
1953
 1st Campeonato Vasco-Navarro de Montaña
 1st Circuito de Getxo
 1st Prueba Villafranca de Ordizia
 1st Trofeo Masferrer
 1st Stage 4 GP Ayutamiento de Bilbao
1954
 1st Prueba Villafranca de Ordizia
 1st Stages 3 & 7 Vuelta a Aragón
 2nd Circuito de Getxo
 3rd National Hill Climb Championships
 3rd Overall Gran Premio de la Bicicleta Eibarresa
1st Stage 2
1955
 1st Campeonato Vasco-Navarro de Montaña
 1st Klasika Primavera
1956
 2nd Prueba Villafranca de Ordizia
 2nd National Hill Climb Championships
 3rd Campeonato Vasco-Navarro de Montaña
1957
 1st  Overall Vuelta a Andalucía
 1st Circuito de Getxo
 1st Stage 2 Gran Premio de la Bicicleta Eibarresa
 2nd Prueba Villafranca de Ordizia
1958
 1st Stage 1 Gran Premio de la Bicicleta Eibarresa
 1st Stages 4 & 8 Vuelta a Andalucía
 3rd Prueba Villafranca de Ordizia

References

External links
 

1928 births
1984 deaths
Spanish male cyclists
People from Estella Oriental
Cyclists from Navarre